Chitti Babu (a.k.a. Sajjiah Adeebh, 10 January 1964 – 8 November 2013) was an Indian Tamil comedian, presenter and actor who prominently played supporting roles in Tamil cinema. He was also one of the judges in the comedy show Asathapovathu Yaaru on Sun TV.

Personal life
Chitti died at the age of 49, after going into a diabetic coma. He is survived by his wife (Zareena Jabeen), 2 daughters (Rizwanah Adeebh, Rifah Adeebh) and one son (Riaz Adeebh).

Filmography

Television
 Hari Giri Assembly (Jaya TV)
 Comedy Time (Sun TV)
 Asathapovathu Yaaru (Sun TV)
 Pondatti Thevai (Sun TV) – Kovilmani

References

External links
 

1964 births
2013 deaths
Tamil male actors
Tamil comedians
Television personalities from Tamil Nadu
Male actors in Tamil cinema
Deaths from diabetes